Farewell to Paradise (1973) is the fourth album by Emitt Rhodes. An eclectic mixture of rock, pop, jazz-funk and soul. Due to the pressure of his record label suing him for his failure to complete his contract for 6 albums in 3 years, many of the songs exhibit more somber, gloomy tones than Rhodes' previous albums.

"Those That Die" is the B-side of "Tame The Lion" single, a furious anti-war song.  "Tame the Lion" has a fast tempo, and "Those That Die" uses part of the lyrics from the bridge of "Tame the Lion", but at a slow tempo and chords from a minor key.

The initial pressings of this album were mispressed and featured the audio from the unreleased album by Toronto band Dixie Rumproast - Well Done.  Many of them are still in circulation.

Track listing
All songs by Emitt Rhodes

 "Warm Self Sacrifice"
 "See No Evil"
 "Drawn to You"
 "Blue Horizon"
 "Shoot the Moon"
 "Only Lovers Decide"
 "Trust Once More"
 "Nights Are Lonely"
 "Bad Man"
 "In Desperate Need"        
 "Those That Die" (from "Tame the Lion")
 "Farewell to Paradise"

Personnel
Emitt Rhodes - all instruments and voices
Keith Olsen - mixdown engineer
Richard Dashut - assistant mixdown engineer

References
 Emitt Rhodes: Recorded at Home, by Kevin Ryan, Tape Op #33, Jan. 2003, pp 44–50.

Emitt Rhodes albums
1973 albums
Dunhill Records albums